Glasscock may refer to:

People with the surname
Craig Glassock (1973-), Australian cricketer
George Washington Glasscock (1810–1868), Texas settler
Jack Glasscock (1859–1947), American baseball player
Kent Glasscock (born 1952), American politician
Mary Miller Glasscock (1872–1925), wife of William E. Glasscock
Rebecca Glasscock, American drag queen and contestant on RuPaul's Drag Race (season 1)
William E. Glasscock (1862–1925), American politician

Places
Glasscock County, Texas

See also
Glascock